Germicidins are a groups of natural products arising from Streptomyces species that acts as autoregulatory inhibitor of spore germination.  In Streptomyces viriochromogenes, low concentrations (200 pM) inhibit germination of its own arthrospores, and higher concentrations inhibit porcine Na+/K+ -activated ATPase. Inhibitory effects on germination are also observed when germicidin from Streptomyces is applied to Lepidium sativum.   Germicidins and other natural products present potential use as pharmaceuticals, and in this case, those with possible antibiotic or antifungal activity.

Four germicidin homologs have been isolated from Streptomyces coelicor: germicidin A, germicidin B, germicidin C, and surugapyrone A (germicidin D).  All compounds inhibit spore germination.  Germicidin A exhibits reversible inhibition as well as having activity resulting in hyphal elongation.

Biosynthesis 
Biosynthesis of the germicidin A,B, and C is achieved through a type III polyketide synthase called germicidin synthase (Gcs).  Surugapyrone A is expected to be synthesized similarly utilizing a Gcs homolog.  Gcs exhibits high substrate flexibility accepting a variety of acyl groups carried and transferred through a thioester bond by either coenzyme A (CoA) or acyl carrier protein (ACP).  Catalytic efficiency is ten fold higher when ACP is the acyl carrier.  Crystal structures of Gcs indicate a characteristic type III structure with the exception of an unusual insertion of 40-residues at the dimer interface.

The biosynthetic pathway of germicidin has not been fully confirmed but according to experimental evidence is expected to utilize starter units arising from fatty acid synthesis and utilize the following proposed scheme: AcpP(ACP) is converted from its apo to holo form with CoA and AcpS (ACP synthase).  FabD then converts holo-AcpP into malonyl-AcpP with malonyl-CoA.  With either isobutyryl-CoA or 2-methylbutyryl-CoA FabH facilitates decarboxylative condensation with malonyl-AcpP to generate an acyl-AcpP intermediate. The acyl intermediate is then condensed and cyclized with either methylmalonyl-CoA or ethylmalonyl-CoA by Gcs to produce germicidin.

Types

References 

Polyketides
Streptomyces
2-Pyrones